Ethyl gallate is a food additive with E number E313.  It is the ethyl ester of gallic acid. Ethyl gallate is added to food as an antioxidant.

Though found naturally in a variety of plant sources including walnuts Terminalia myriocarpa or chebulic myrobolan (Terminalia chebula), ethyl gallate is produced from gallic acid and ethanol. It can be found in wine.

See also 
 Phenolic content in wine

References 

Food antioxidants
Phenols